James Thomas Beardall (18 October 1946 – 13 February 2014) was an English footballer who played as a forward.

Club career
Born in Heywood, Greater Manchester, Beardall started his career with boyhood club Bury as an amateur, going as far as to reject a trial at Manchester United in favour of the club he supported.

He continued as an amateur before playing for Blackburn Rovers and Oldham Athletic as a professional.

Personal life
Beardall passed away in 2014, after suffering with dementia.

References

1946 births
2014 deaths
Footballers from Greater Manchester
English footballers
Association football forwards
Bury F.C. players
Blackburn Rovers F.C. players
Oldham Athletic A.F.C. players
Great Harwood F.C. players
Radcliffe F.C. players